The Institute of Electrical and Electronics Engineers Standards Association (IEEE SA) is an operating unit within IEEE that develops global standards in a broad range of industries, including: power and energy, artificial intelligence systems, internet of things, consumer technology and consumer electronics, biomedical and health care, learning technology, information technology and robotics, telecommunication, automotive, transportation, home automation, nanotechnology, information assurance, emerging technologies, and many more.

IEEE SA has developed standards for over a century, through a program that offers balance, openness, fair procedures, and consensus. Technical experts from all over the world participate in the development of IEEE standards.

IEEE SA provides a neutral platform that unites communities for standards development and technological innovation and is independent of any government oversight. IEEE SA develops standards that are consensus-based and has two types of standards development participation models. These are individual and entity.

IEEE SA is not a body formally authorized by any government, but rather a community. ISO, IEC and ITU are recognized international standards organizations. ISO members are national standards bodies such as American ANSI, German DIN or Japanese JISC. IEC members are so called National Committees, some of which are hosted by national standards bodies. These are not identical to ISO members. Both IEC and ISO develop International Standards that are consensus-based and follow the "one country one vote principle", representing broad industry needs. Their standards cannot be sponsored by individual companies or organizations.

The 2021-2022 IEEE SA President is Jim Matthews. Jim has been active in IEEE for over 28 years. He belongs to the IEEE SA, IEEE Communications Society, IEEE Photonics Society, IEEE Power & Energy Society, and the IEEE Technology and Engineering Management Society. Jim has also been a member of the ANSI Board since 2001, IEC Vice-President and SMB Chair, and was an ITU-T Rapporteur for over 10 years. Previous Presidents of the IEEE SA include Robert S. Fish (2019-2020), F. Don Wright (2017-2018), Bruce Kraemer (2015-2016, and Karen Bartleson (2013-2014).

The 2023 Chair of IEEE SA Standards Board (SASB) is David J. Law.  Previous SASB chairs include J.P. Faure, John Kulick, and Gary Hoffman.

In March 2020, IEEE Standards Association Open - SA Open, (for open source software) announced Silone Bonewald as its new Executive Director.

Membership 

IEEE SA has two membership options that enable enhanced participation in IEEE SA activities, standards development, and governance. These are:
 Corporate Membership accommodates the needs of organizations of any size, enabling multi-stakeholder participation on corporate or “entity” standards development projects. 
 Individual Membership is designed for independent professionals and others interested in participation in individual standards development projects.

At IEEE SA, participation is open to everyone. However, IEEE SA Individual or Corporate Members benefit from enhanced participation privileges.
IEEE SA Members enjoy added benefits, including but not limited to the ability to hold working group positions, vote on standards, assume leadership positions in standards working groups and activities, and participate in elections for IEEE SA governing bodies. 
The IEEE has various related programs in addition to standards development, including Industry Connections, Registries, Conformity Assessment, Alliance Management Services, and IEEE SA Open (for open source).

Standards

The standardization process 
Each year, the IEEE SA conducts over 200 standards ballots, a process by which proposed standards are voted upon for technical reliability and soundness. In 2020, IEEE had over 1,200 active standards, with over 650 standards under development.

One of the more notable are the IEEE 802 LAN/MAN group of standards, with the widely used computer networking standards for both wired (ethernet, aka IEEE 802.3) and wireless (IEEE 802.11 and IEEE 802.16) networks, IEEE 1547 Standard for Interconnecting Distributed Resources with Electric Power Systems, and ISO/IEEE 11073 Standards for Health Informatics.

The IEEE standards development process can be broken down into six basic steps:

Initiating the Project: An IEEE SA Standards Board approved standards committee must oversee a standard project. The Standards Committee provides oversight for the standard from inception to completion. The standards committees are supported by the technical societies within IEEE. To gain authorization for the standard a Project Authorization Request (PAR) is submitted to the IEEE SA Standards Board. The New Standards Committee (NesCom) of the IEEE SA Standards Board reviews the PAR and makes a recommendation to the Standards Board about whether to approve the PAR.
Mobilizing the Working Group: After the PAR is approved, a working group of individuals affected by, or interested in, the standard is organized to develop the standard. IEEE SA rules ensure that all Working Group meetings are open and that anyone has the right to attend and contribute to the meetings.
Drafting the Standard: The Working Group prepares a draft of the proposed standard. Generally, the draft follows the IEEE Standards Style Manual that sets guidelines for the clauses and format of the standards document.
Balloting the Standard: Once a draft of the standard is finalized in the Working Group, the draft is submitted for Balloting approval. The IEEE Standards Department sends an invitation-to-ballot to any individual who has expressed an interest in the subject matter of the standard. Anyone who responds positively to the invitation-to-ballot becomes a member of the balloting group, as long as the individual is an IEEE Standards Association member or has paid a balloting fee. The IEEE requires that a proposed draft of the standard receive a response rate of 75% (i.e., at least 75% of potential ballots are returned) and that, of the responding ballots, at least 75% approve the proposed draft of the standard. If the standard is not approved, the process returns to the drafting of the standard step in order to modify the standard document to gain approval of the balloting group.
Gaining Final Approval: After getting 75% approval, the draft standard, along with the balloting comments, are submitted to the IEEE SA Standards Board Review Committee (RevCom). The RevCom reviews the proposed draft of the standard against the IEEE SA Standards Board Bylaws and the stipulations set forth in the IEEE SA Standards Board Operations Manual. The RevCom then makes a recommendation about whether to approve the submitted draft of the standard document. Each member of the IEEE SA Standards Board places a final vote on the submitted standard document. It takes a majority vote of the Standards Board to gain final approval of the standard.
Maintaining the Standard: A standard has a validity period of ten years from the date of IEEE SA Standards Board approval. Amendments that offer minor revisions or extensions to the standard, and corrigenda that makes corrections to the standard can be developed and balloted, but the creation of amendments and corrigenda does not affect the ten-year validity rule. At the end of this period, one of two things has to happen: revision or withdrawal. If no action is taken, the standard will be moved to inactive-reserved status. Sometimes a standard may need a technical or editorial correction to be made. As part of the standards development process, IEEE can accommodate this by issuing a corrigenda or errata Sheet.

IEEE SA supports the development, production, and distribution of standards by:

 Reaching across borders and disciplines to inspire participation in standards development
 Upholding a framework for the development and maintenance of open, market-driven standards that are voluntarily adopted, based on merit
 Igniting collaboration and building consensus by adhering to fair and equitable practices, proven policies and procedures 
 Addressing both established and emerging technologies for maximum human and market benefit 
 Supporting standards implementation by providing supplemental resources, products, and services that support development teams
 Providing rigorous oversight to ensure that no single party unfairly influences the standards development process
 Encouraging global adoption through the promotion and international distribution of standards and standards-related resources

The patent policy 

Because the IEEE's standards often incorporate technologies that are covered by one or more patent claims, the IEEE SA has developed and added to its governing bylaws a patent policy to ensure both that the implementers using the standard-essential patented technology in their standard-compliant products have access to that technology and that the patent holders that voluntarily contribute those technologies to the standard receive adequate compensation for the implementers' use. An important part of the IEEE patent policy is the FRAND commitment, which is a voluntary contractual commitment signifying that a patent holder with patented technology that has been adopted into one of the IEEE's standards will accept as adequate compensation a fair, reasonable, and non-discriminatory royalty for third-party use of that technology. Most standard-setting organizations have developed similar patent policies with similar commitments.

In 2014, the IEEE SA became the center of a large academic debate among economic and legal scholars when it appointed an ad hoc committee to recommend and subsequently draft amendments to the IEEE patent policy, to which the IEEE Board of Governors gave final approval in February 2015 and which went into effect in March 2015. The IEEE said that the reason for the amendments was to increase the clarity of the patent policy and the obligations that the patent policy's FRAND commitment imposes on patent holders seeking to enforce their standard-essential patents. One particularly controversial amendment was a provision that prohibited patent holders from seeking injunctions and exclusion orders (from the ITC) against infringers of standard-essential patents.

The Antitrust Division stated its support for the 2015 patent policy revisions in a business review letter that it issued in January 2015, upon request from the IEEE SA. In the letter, the Antitrust Division said that the provisions would unambiguously produce net benefits for consumers with insignificant anticompetitive implications. At least one commentator has criticized the Antitrust Division's legal and economic analysis put forth in its business review letter of the revisions, claiming that the Antitrust Division exaggerated the patent policy's procompetitive benefits and wrongly dismissed as unlikely some of its potential anticompetitive costs.

The IEEE Get Program 
The IEEE Get Program makes some standards publicly available for download: This program grants public access to view and download current individual standards at zero charges. On July 11, 2017, the IEEE Get Program moved to the IEEE Xplore digital library website and standards eligible for the program past that date will only be made available there. On September 1, 2017, the original website was decommissioned and remains, without further updates, to redirect visitors.

Boards and committees 
 
A member-elected IEEE SA Board of Governors (BOG) directs the activities of the IEEE SA to establish and maintain policy, provide financial oversight and conduct standards-related activities within IEEE technological fields.  It also establishes and oversees boards and committees to carry out the work of the IEEE SA. These boards and committees include:

 The IEEE SA Standards Board, which initiates standards projects and reviews standards in development to ensure consensus, due process, openness, and balance 
 The Awards & Recognition Committee, which is responsible for the administration of award programs administered  by the IEEE SA
 The Corporate Advisory Group, which serves as an advisory body to IEEE SA Corporate Members and to the IEEE SA BOG to ensure a broad spectrum of industry interests and global perspectives are active
 The Registration Authority Committee, which oversees the activities of the IEEE Registration Authority
 The Strategic Planning Coordination Committee, which is responsible for defining IEEE SA positioning and the creation, execution and adjustment of the IEEE SA strategic plan

The IEEE SA BOG has eight Strategic Management and Delivery Committees   to address strategic focus areas that are necessary and critical for the IEEE SA to achieve long-term organizational objectives. These are:
 
 Financial Sustainability: Strives to ensure IEEE SA long-term financial sustainability, financial transparency, and appropriate management of the financial portfolio. It creates tools to aid the business and investment plans for IEEE SA projects.
 Industry Engagement and Sector Strategies: Manages a strategic industry engagement framework that aims to bring companies and industry consortia into the IEEE SA ecosystem.
 Market Incubation and Business Acceleration: Cultivates the growth of a single or of a few strategically important businesses through focused dedication of resources.
 Marketing Strategies, Technology Policy, Government Engagement, and Regional Marketing Campaigns and Activities: Supports IEEE SA business growth via promotion of brand awareness, provision of all aspects of marketing support, and engagement in public policy initiatives that enhance the reputation of the IEEE SA.
 Platform Infrastructure Optimization: Assists in the provision of software infrastructure tools and platforms that enable customers, volunteers, and IEEE staff to effectively and efficiently leverage the IEEE SA ecosystem to achieve their goals.
 Product and Service Innovation: Helps to create, grow, and manage IEEE SA’s product and services portfolio, with an emphasis on products and services that complement IEEE SA’s core consensus businesses.
 Standards and Standards Innovations: Works to ensure that the standardization environment of the IEEE SA continues to meet the needs of its membership and offers a vibrant home for consensus standards development. In addition, this SMDC aids in the development of standardization processes and governance, including enhancing volunteer engagement and education.
 Technical Innovation and Engagement: Supports IEEE SA’s strategic interests through interaction and collaboration with other operational units within IEEE.[16]

Notable IEEE Standards committees and formats

Awards
The IEEE SA recognizes outstanding standards development participation through various award categories.

References

External links 
IEEE Standards website
Beyond Standards by IEEE SA
Standards University by IEEE Standards Education Committee (IEEE-SEC) a joint committee of IEEE SA and IEEE-EAB

IEEE standards
Standards organizations in the United States
Institute of Electrical and Electronics Engineers